Chūichi Nagumo (Nagumo Chūichi; 25 March 1887 – 6 July 1944) was an admiral in the Imperial Japanese Navy (IJN) during World War II. Nagumo led Japan's main carrier battle group, the Kido Butai, in the attack on Pearl Harbor, the Indian Ocean raid and the Battle of Midway. He committed suicide during the Battle of Saipan.

Early life
Nagumo was born in the city of Yonezawa, Yamagata Prefecture, in northern Japan in 1887. He graduated from the 36th class of the IJN Academy in 1908, with a ranking of 8 out of a class of 191 cadets. After his promotion to ensign in 1910, he was assigned to cruiser .

After attending torpedo and naval artillery schools, he was promoted to sub-lieutenant and served in the battleship , followed by the destroyer . In 1914, he was promoted to lieutenant and was assigned to the battlecruiser , followed by the destroyer . He was assigned his first command, the destroyer , on 15 December 1917.

Nagumo graduated from the Naval War College, and was promoted to lieutenant commander in 1920. His specialty was torpedo and destroyer tactics. From 1920 to 1921, he was captain of the destroyer , but was soon sent to shore duty with various assignments by the IJN General Staff. He became a commander in 1924. From 1925 to 1926, Nagumo accompanied a Japanese mission to study naval warfare strategy, tactics, and equipment in Western Europe and the United States.

After his return to Japan, Nagumo was assigned to duties in Chinese territorial waters.  He was appointed captain of the river gunboat  from 20 March 1926 to 15 October 1926, followed by the gunboat  from 15 October 1926 to 15 November 1927. He then served as an instructor at the IJN Academy from 1927 to 1929. Nagumo was promoted to captain in November 1929 and assumed command of the light cruiser  and from 1930 to 1931 was commander of the 11th Destroyer Division. After serving in administrative positions from 1931 to 1933, he assumed command of the heavy cruiser  from 1933 to 1934, and the battleship  from 1934 to 1935. He was promoted to Rear Admiral on 1 November 1935.

As a Rear Admiral, Nagumo commanded the 8th Cruiser Division to support Imperial Japanese Army movements in China from the Yellow Sea. As a leading officer of the militaristic Fleet Faction, he also received a boost in his career from political forces.

From 1937 to 1938, he was commandant of the Torpedo School, and from 1938 to 1939, he was commander of the 3rd Cruiser Division. Nagumo was promoted to vice admiral on 15 November 1939. From November 1940 to April 1941, Nagumo was commandant of the Naval War College.

World War II
On 10 April 1941, Nagumo was appointed commander-in-chief of the First Air Fleet, the IJN′s main carrier battle group, largely due to his seniority. Many contemporaries and historians have doubted his suitability for this command, given his lack of familiarity with naval aviation.

By this time, he had visibly aged, physically and mentally. Physically, he suffered from arthritis, possibly from his younger days as a kendoka. Mentally, he had become a cautious officer who carefully worked over the tactical plans of every operation in which he was involved.

Admiral Nishizo Tsukahara had doubts about Nagumo's appointment, and commented, "Nagumo was an officer of the old school, a specialist of torpedo and surface maneuvers.... He did not have any idea of the capability and potential of naval aviation." One son of Nagumo described him as a brooding father, obsessed with and later regretful about pressuring his sons into joining the IJN. In contrast, Nagumo's junior naval officers thought of him as a father figure.

Despite his limited experience, he was a strong advocate of combining sea and air power, although he was opposed to Admiral Isoroku Yamamoto's plan to attack the United States Navy Naval Station Pearl Harbor. While commanding the First Air Fleet, Nagumo oversaw the attack on Pearl Harbor, but he was later criticized for his failure to launch a third attack, which might have destroyed the fuel oil storage and repair facilities. This could have rendered the most important U.S. naval base in the Pacific useless, especially as the use of the submarine base and intelligence station at the installation were critical factors in Japan's defeat in the Pacific War.

Nagumo was surrounded by able lieutenants such as Minoru Genda and Mitsuo Fuchida. He also fought well in the early 1942 campaigns, obtaining success as a fleet commander at the Bombing of Darwin and at the Indian Ocean raid on the Eastern Fleet, the latter of which sank an aircraft carrier, two cruisers, and two destroyers, and caused Admiral Sir James Somerville to retreat to East Africa.

Battle of Midway

The Battle of Midway, in June 1942, brought Nagumo's near-perfect record to an end. During the battle, a Martin B-26 Marauder, after being seriously damaged by anti-aircraft fire, flew directly towards the bridge of the aircraft carrier . The aircraft, either attempting a suicide ramming, or out of control due to battle damage or a wounded or killed pilot, narrowly missed crashing into the carrier's bridge, which could have killed Nagumo and his command staff, before it cartwheeled into the sea. This experience may well have contributed to Nagumo's determination to launch another attack on Midway, in direct violation of Yamamoto's order to keep the reserve strike force armed for anti-ship operations. However when Nagumo received scouting reports that American ships were in the area, he changed plans and ordered his planes be armed back to attack American ships.
It appears the situation caught him somewhere in-between, with half his planes armed with torpedoes (for ships) and the other half with bombs (for land offensives) and no time to switch everything back to torpedoes. And, as an officer always going by naval doctrine, he decided to wait to arm the entire air fleet with torpedoes before launching an offensive, instead of starting it with whatever available at hand.

As Nagumo began to grasp the enormity of what had happened, he appears to have gone into a state of shock. Nagumo stood near the ship’s compass looking out at the flames on his flagship and two other carriers in a trance-like daze. Despite being asked to abandon ship, Nagumo was reluctant to leave, just muttering, “It's not time yet”. Nagumo's chief of staff, Rear Admiral Ryūnosuke Kusaka, was able to persuade him and Nagumo responded with a barely perceptible nod, with tears in his eyes. Nagumo and his staff were forced to evacuate through the forward windows of the bridge by rope. An expert in judo, Nagumo landed lightly, whereas Kusaka badly sprained both ankles and was burned during the evacuation. The First Air Fleet lost four carriers during the turning point of the Pacific War, and the massive losses of carrier aircraft maintenance personnel would prove detrimental to the performance of the IJN in later engagements. The loss of the four carriers, their aircraft, and their maintenance crews, plus the loss of 120 experienced pilots, resulted in Japan losing the strategic initiative in the Pacific. Nagumo contemplated suicide but was eventually talked out of taking his own life by Kusaka. Following the battle, Nagumo appeared to have lost his aggressiveness and effectiveness. He never recovered from the loss of his carriers, and teared up when talking about the defeat to his son in 1944.

Later naval operations, Guadalcanal campaign and the Battle of Saipan

Afterwards, Nagumo was reassigned as commander-in-chief of the Third Fleet and commanded aircraft carriers in the Guadalcanal campaign in the battles of the Eastern Solomons and the Santa Cruz Islands. There his actions were largely indecisive and slowly frittered away much of Japan's maritime strength.

On 11 November 1942, Nagumo was reassigned to Japan, where he was given command of the Sasebo Naval District. He transferred to the Kure Naval District on 21 June 1943. From October 1943 to February 1944, Nagumo was again commander-in-chief of First Fleet, which was by that time largely involved in only training duties.

As Japan's military situation deteriorated, Nagumo was deployed on 4 March 1944 for the short-lived command of the 14th Air Fleet and the Central Pacific Area Fleet in the Mariana Islands.

The Battle of Saipan began on 15 June 1944. The IJN, under Vice Admiral Jisaburō Ozawa, was overwhelmed within days by the U.S. 5th Fleet in the decisive Battle of the Philippine Sea, where Japan lost three fleet carriers and about 600 aircraft. Nagumo and his Army peer Lieutenant General Yoshitsugu Saito were now on their own to keep control of Saipan.

Death
On 6 July, Nagumo killed himself with a pistol to the temple rather than the traditional seppuku. His remains were recovered by U.S. Marines in the cave where he spent his last days as the Japanese commander of Saipan. He was posthumously promoted to admiral and awarded the Grand Cordon of the Order of the Golden Kite.

Nagumo's grave is located at the Ōbai-in sub-temple of Engaku-ji in Kamakura, next to the grave of his son, Susumu Nagumo, who was killed in battle aboard the destroyer  on 4 December 1944.

Naval career

In popular culture
In the 1970 film Tora! Tora! Tora!, Nagumo was portrayed by Japanese actor Eijirō Tōno.

In the 1976 film Midway, Nagumo was portrayed by American actor James Shigeta. Nagumo states during the American torpedo attacks:
 There is no evidence that Nagumo said this in reality. When the Akagi is bombed, Nagumo suffers a concussion. As he is tended by Genda, the captain asks, "Admiral, you must transfer your flag. The cruiser  is close by." Nagumo, disheartened, says "Advise Admiral Yamaguchi." 

In the 2011 film Isoroku, Nagumo was portrayed by Japanese actor Takeo Nakahara.

In the 2019 film Midway, Nagumo was portrayed by Japanese actor Jun Kunimura.

In the 2004 video game Axis and Allies, Nagumo is one of four playable Japanese commanders, alongside his more famous superior, Yamamoto.

Douglas Niles featured Nagumo in his alternate history novel MacArthur's War: A Novel of the Invasion of Japan (2007).

Notes

References

Further reading

External links

 Vice Admiral Chuichi Nagumo, IJN, (1886-1944) 
 Beyond the Movie: Pearl Harbor
 WW2DB: Chuichi Nagumo
 Breaching the Marianas: The Battle for Saipan (Marines in World War II Commemorative Series)

1887 births
1944 deaths
People from Yamagata Prefecture
Attack on Pearl Harbor
Battle of Midway
Japanese admirals of World War II
Imperial Japanese Navy admirals
Japanese military personnel who committed suicide
Suicides by firearm in the Northern Mariana Islands